Benthosema pterotum, also known as the skinnycheek lanternfish and opaline lanternfish, is a species of fish in the family Myctophidae. It is found in the Indian Ocean and western Pacific Ocean. It is dominant species in the mesopelagic of the Red Sea and the Gulf of Aden. It is a minor fishery species.

Benthosema pterotum grows to  total length.

References 

Myctophidae
Fish of the Indian Ocean
Fish of the Pacific Ocean
Fish of the Red Sea
Fish described in 1890
Taxa named by Alfred William Alcock